Hans Robert Hermann Hickmann (b. Roßlau, Germany, May 19, 1908; d. Blandford Forum, England, September 4, 1968) was an eminent German musicologist. He lived in Egypt and specialized in the music and organology of Ancient Egypt, and survivals thereof in Egyptian traditional music. He wrote about Egypt's tradition of cheironomy (as practiced in Ancient Egypt and still found in Coptic music) for the Grove Dictionary of Music and Musicians.

He studied at the University of Berlin, studying with Curt Sachs and Erich von Hornbostel, and graduating in 1934. He also played the piano and organ, and conducted

Hickmann first investigated Egyptian music in 1932-33, during a visit to the Siwa Oasis, and settled in Egypt in 1933. He operated a conservatory called Musica Viva, located at 1 Seket el Fadl in downtown Cairo.

His notable students included the composer Rifaat Garrana.

References

Books by Hans Hickmann
Hickmann, Hans (1980). Miscellanea musicologica (Vies et travaux). Organization des antiquites de l'Egypte, Service des musees. . .

Articles by Hans Hickmann
Hickmann, Hans. "Un Zikr Dans le Mastaba de Debhen, Guîzah (IVème Dynastie)." Journal of the International Folk Music Council, v. 9 (1957), pp. 59–62.
Hickmann, Hans. "La chironomie dans l'Egypte ancienne." Zeitschrift fur ägyptische Sprache und Altertumkunde, vol. 83, no. 2 (1958).

Obituaries
"Hans R. H. Hickmann (1908 - 1968)." Ethnomusicology, v. 13, no. 2 (May 1969), pp. 316–319.

1908 births
1968 deaths
People from Dessau-Roßlau
People from the Duchy of Anhalt
Writers from Cairo
Humboldt University of Berlin alumni
20th-century German musicologists
German expatriates in Egypt